Lambert Road Baptist Church is an evangelical church located in the suburb of Morningside, in Durban, South Africa. This church is a member of the Baptist Union of Southern Africa.

History
Lambert Road Baptist Church was planted in Durban in 1904 by the Durban Central (West Street) and Bulwer Road Baptist Churches to minister to "the Stamford Hill area", what is today the suburb of Morningside. During the 1950s and 1960s the church had an all age Sunday school of 200, and a significant young adult ministry.

Pastors
Pastors who have served at Lambert Road Baptist Church over the years are:

Vision
The vision of the Lambert Road Baptist Church, captured in their logo, is to be:
 Solidly based on God's Word, committed to expository preaching;
 United under Jesus, who is the Head of the Church;
 Centred on the cross of Christ, which is their hope of glory; and
 Shining for Jesus into their community and beyond.

The first pastor at Lambert Road Baptist Church, Richard Miller, when he arrived in Durban, was quoted as saying, "What faith and hope, how much of love and labour, how many prayers, how many tears, have gone to building the fabric that has now arisen in the Lambert Road Baptist Church, is known to God."

References

1904 establishments in South Africa
1904 establishments in the Colony of Natal
Baptist churches in South Africa
20th-century Baptist churches
Churches in Durban
Christian organizations established in 1904
20th-century religious buildings and structures in South Africa